The discography of former professional basketball player and rapper Shaquille O'Neal consists of four studio albums, two compilation albums, two soundtracks, one unreleased album, and nine singles. O'Neal played in the NBA from 1992 until 2011. Around 1993, O'Neal was signed to Jive Records where he released his debut album, Shaq Diesel, in that year. The album peaked at number 25 on the Billboard 200, number 10 on R&B/Hip-Hop Albums, and was certified platinum by the Recording Industry Association of America (RIAA). Shaq Diesel produced four singles. The first, "What's Up Doc? (Can We Rock)", peaked at number 39 on the Billboard Hot 100, number 56 on R&B/Hip-Hop Songs, number 22 on Rap Songs, and was certified gold by the RIAA. The second,  "(I Know I Got) Skillz", peaked at number 35 on the Billboard Hot 100, number 20 on R&B/Hip-Hop Songs, number 3 on Rap Songs, and was certified gold by the RIAA. It also peaked at number 34 on the New Zealand Singles Chart. The third, "I'm Outstanding", peaked at number 47 on the Billboard Hot 100, number 29 on R&B/Hip-Hop Songs, and number 6 on Rap Songs. Internationally, it peaked at number 43 on the New Zealand Singles Chart and number 70 on the UK Singles Chart. The fourth, "Shoot Pass Slam", did not chart.

Shaq Fu: Da Return (1994) was the rapper's second album. It peaked at number 67 on the Billboard 200, number 19 on R&B/Hip-Hop Albums, and was certified gold by the RIAA. The album spawned two singles: "Biological Didn't Bother" and "No Hook". The first peaked at number 78 on the Billboard Hot 100, 54 on R&B/Hip-Hop Songs, and 18 on Rap Songs. The second peaked at number 66 on R&B/Hip-Hop Songs and 16 on Rap Songs. O'Neal released his third album, You Can't Stop the Reign, in 1996. It peaked at number 82 on the Billboard 200 and number 21 on R&B/Hip-Hop Albums. You Can't Stop the Reign had two singles. The first, "You Can't Stop the Reign", peaked at number 54 on R&B/Hip-Hop Songs, 47 on the New Zealand Singles Chart, and 40 on the UK Singles Chart. The second single, "Strait Playin', peaked at number 33 on R&B/Hip-Hop Songs and number 17 on the New Zealand Singles Chart. He followed the release with his first compilation, The Best of Shaquille O'Neal (1996), and two soundtracks, Kazaam (1996) and Steel (1997). The last peaked at number 185 on the Billboard 200 and number 26 on R&B/Hip-Hop Albums.

O'Neal released his fourth album, Respect, in 1996. It peaked at number 58 on the Billboard 200 and number 8 on R&B/Hip-Hop Albums. Only one single, "The Way It's Goin' Down", was released. It peaked at number 47 on R&B/Hip-Hop Songs and 62 on the UK Singles Chart. The rapper had a fifth album, Shaquille O'Neal Presents His Superfriends, Vol. 1, planned to release in 2001; however, it was cancelled. Although the album was cancelled, three singles were released, but they did not chart. In 2006, O'Neal's second compilation album was released, but it did not chart.

Albums

Studio albums

Compilation albums

Soundtrack albums

Unreleased albums

Singles

Guest appearances

Music videos 

Music videos featured in

Notes 
A  "No Hook" did not enter the Billboard Hot 100, but peaked at number 3 on Bubbling Under Hot 100 Singles.
B  "Connected" did not enter R&B/Hip-Hop Songs, but peaked at number 4 on Bubbling Under Hot R&B/Hip-Hop Singles.
C  "In The Sun" did not enter R&B/Hip-Hop Songs, but peaked at number 9 on Bubbling Under Hot R&B/Hip-Hop Singles.

References

External links 
 [ Albums] at Billboard
 Compilations at Allmusic
 Compilations at Billboard
 DVDs & Videos at Allmusic
 Main Albums at Allmusic
 Singles & EPs at Allmusic

Discography
Discographies of American artists
Hip hop discographies
Basketball music